Siesikai is a town in Ukmergė district municipality, Vilnius County, east Lithuania. According to the 2011 census, the town has a population of 508 people. The town has a Catholic Church.

Its alternate names include Sesikay, Sesiki, Sessiki, Siesiki (Polish), Siesikų, Sesik or Sheshik (Yiddish), and Siyesikay.

References

Towns in Vilnius County
Towns in Lithuania
Vilkomirsky Uyezd
Ukmergė District Municipality